WeeBoom is a Brazilian animated television series created and directed by Jonas Brandão and produced by Split Studio by Ancine, and aired by Boomerang Brazil on July 5, 2019 and May 24, 2020. The series shows an adventurous rabbit named Wee, who was traveling on an unknown mountain, accidentally hit the green circle and came out several flying creatures called Boomies, & with the help of the Boomies' guardian, Boom, they cross the entire world to capture the boomies.

The series has currently aired on Canal Futura since January 3, 2020.

Characters 
 Wee (voiced by Jussara Marques) She is a very smart and courageous adventurous green rabbit.
 Boomies (voiced by Pier Marchi) they are magical little creatures that live inside Boom's stomach, when they hear a song from each place, they go "crazy" and bring chaos to the cities where they are found.
 Boom (voiced by Ítalo Luiz) It is a yellow monster, which can become giant, among several other of its special powers.

Episodes

References

External links
 
 
 Boomerang Brazil website 

2010s Brazilian animated television series
Brazilian children's animated television series
2019 Brazilian television series debuts
2020 Brazilian television series endings
Boomerang (TV network) original programming
Animated television series about rabbits and hares
Animated television series about monsters